The Archdiocesan Shrine of Santa Teresa de Avila, previously known as Santa Teresa de Avila Church, is a Roman Catholic church located in Talisay, Cebu, Philippines. Built in 1836 until 1848, architecturally, the church is in classical Graeco-Roman style, featuring the facade's two bell towers connected by a porch with two supporting columns on the foyer. On October 15, 2007, it was declared an Archdiocesan Shrine and pilgrims could receive plenary indulgence for a year.

Design 
The church was made from coral stones and contained embellished interiors and five gilded altars. Its original design was cruciform with two semicircular transepts and the twin belfries on each side of the façade, with a connecting balustraded portico that is supported by two columns on the main entrance, are its prominent feature. Inside, hanging above the crossing is a large round chandelier. According to Filipinas Heritage Library, the church used "round arch, rectangular piers with engaged shafts, and an arcade." Felipe Redondo, writing in the late 19th century, described its architecture as Doric (classical Graeco-Roman) in style.

The church's structure was remodeled, and two new wings were added on each side of the main nave. Its original stonewalls were preserved, its old arched windows and side entrances still visible to this day.

History 
The church's name was in honor of Teresa of Avila, its patron saint. Talisay during the Spanish times was a property of Augustinian friars and a visita of San Nicolas, which was a district south of then municipality of Cebu and to which it was later annexed. The area separated from San Nicolas when the local population boomed and on August 16, 1836, the parish was declared independent under Father Juan Soriano by virtue of a royal decree signed on April 25, 1836. Interestingly the tomb of another priest possibly the predecessor of Juan Soriano is still extant inside one of the small chapels inside the church. 

Construction began in 1836 and the works were completed in 1848. When a typhoon caused the destruction of the church's roof made of clay tiles, it was renovated with iron sheets in 1877 and in 1894, the interiors were decorated. Towards the conclusion of World War II, the building sustained heavy damage to all parts of the church and the nearby convent did not survive the war. One of the few parts of the church that sustained little damage was the facade which still remains in its original state. Post-war restoration efforts were carried out by Teofilo Camomot and because of damage sustained during World War 2 the roof was lowered significantly.

Archdiocesan Shrine 
On October 15, 2007, coinciding its fiesta celebration, the parish was declared as an Archdiocesan Shrine by then Cebu Archbishop Ricardo Cardinal Vidal. Pilgrims who visited the church on certain days of the month between the declaration date until October 15, 2008 would receive plenary indulgence.

References 

Roman Catholic churches in Cebu
Spanish Colonial architecture in the Philippines
Tourist attractions in Cebu
1836 establishments in the Philippines
19th-century Roman Catholic church buildings in the Philippines
Roman Catholic churches completed in 1836
Churches in the Roman Catholic Archdiocese of Cebu